Vicente Msosa (born Chuanga, 18 February 1981) is a Mozambican Anglican bishop. He has been the bishop of the Diocese of Niassa, in Mozambique, at the Anglican Church of Southern Africa, since 1 April 2017. He was installed the youngest bishop of the Anglican Communion, aged 35 years old. He is married to Anastacia and they have three children.

Early life and ecclesiastical career
He was educated locally and after finishing secondary school, he moved to the Teacher Training College, where he studied to be a teacher. While working as a teacher he was also involved in evangelism.

He studied Theology at the College of Transfiguration, in Grahamstown, South Africa, where he obtained a diploma. He was ordained a deacon and later a priest in 2013. He then studied for a degree in Theology at Malawain Lake Anglican University, and for a M.D. in Ministry at the Minnesota Graduate School of Theology. He was the priest at the São Paulo's Church in Lichinga when he was elected bishop.

The Elective Assembly of the Diocese of Niassa failed to elect a bishop in January 2016, leaving the nomination to the House of Bishops of the Anglican Church of Southern Africa. He was selected in September 2016 and consecrated on 25 February 2017. Msosa's installation took place at the Cathedral of Lichinga at 1 April 2017, in a service presided by Archbishop Thabo Makgoba.

He was one of the two bishops of the Anglican Church of Southern Africa to attend GAFCON III, in Jerusalem, on 17–22 June 2018.

References

External links
Church's youngest bishop installed in Mozambique, Anglican Ink, 3 April 2017

1981 births
Living people
Mozambican Anglicans
Anglican bishops of Niassa
21st-century Anglican bishops in Africa